Crystal Dynamics is an American video game developer that was founded in 1992 by Madeline Canepa, Judy Lange, and Dave Morse. Based in the San Francisco Bay Area, California, Crystal Dynamics was the first licensed developer for Panasonic's original 3DO console, a gaming hardware platform founded by Kleiner Perkins. Their first release, Crash 'n Burn, was a launch game for the system and was included as a pack-in game with the console. The 3DO's launch during the 1993 Christmas season was a commercial failure, severely damaging Crystal Dynamics' software strategy. In 1994, the company became a publisher for two new gaming platforms, the PlayStation and the Sega Saturn. The studio was acquired by Eidos Interactive, a British video game publisher, in 1998. After Square Enix acquired Eidos in 2009, Crystal Dynamics became a subsidiary of Square Enix.

Crystal Dynamics is best known for developing the Legacy of Kain and Gex series. Although the first Legacy of Kain video game was developed by Silicon Knights, Crystal Dynamics gained the rights to the franchise in 1998 and released four sequels between 1999 and 2003. In 2003, the studio took over the development of the best-selling Tomb Raider franchise after its original developer, Core Design, failed to gain critical or commercial success with their later games. Crystal Dynamics' first Tomb Raider game, Tomb Raider: Legend, became a commercial success with 4.5 million copies sold as of February 2009. Its sequel, Tomb Raider: Underworld, sold 2.6 million copies and became the first game the studio developed for the PlayStation 3. Since 2003, the studio has focused development on the Tomb Raider franchise with the help of other studios such as Buzz Monkey Software and Nixxes Software. Crystal Dynamics has developed five games in the series, encompassing two reboots of the franchise.

Video games
, 36 video games have been developed by Crystal Dynamics. The following table showcases the corresponding title, release date, publisher and the platforms on which each game was released along with any other relevant information. A detailed overview of each game can be found in their corresponding articles.

Notes

References

San Francisco Bay Area-related lists
Video game lists by company